Alfred Hensel (8 March 1880 – 15 September 1969) was a German architect and director of the Nuremberg parks department. He won a gold medal for town planning in the art competitions at the 1928 Summer Olympics. He was awarded the medal for his work on the sports and leisure park on the eastern bank of Dutzendteich Lake in Nuremberg. At the time the arena was described as "the most beautiful stadium in the world".

References

1880 births
1969 deaths
19th-century German architects
Medalists at the 1928 Summer Olympics
Olympic gold medalists for Germany
Olympic competitors in art competitions
20th-century German architects